Proto-Baltic (PB, PBl, Common Baltic) is the unattested, reconstructed ancestral proto-language of all Baltic languages. It is not attested in writing, but has been partly reconstructed through the comparative method by gathering the collected data on attested Baltic and other Indo-European languages. It represents the common Baltic speech that approximately was spoken between the 3rd millennium BC and ca. 5th century BC, after which it began dividing into Western and Eastern Baltic languages. Proto-Baltic is thought to have been a fusional language and is associated with the Corded Ware and Trzciniec cultures. Baltic languages share some common features with Slavic languages, suggesting the possibility of an earlier linguistic unity in development.

Generally, Proto-Baltic had a SOV word order. Proto-Baltic is said to have possessed certain unique traits, such as free accentuation with two pitch accents, turning short Proto-Indo-European vowels *o, *a into *a, retaining and further developing the Proto-Indo-European ablaut, retaining *m before dental consonants and the productivity of the word stem ē. Also, the proto-language is thought to have had its own set of  diminutive suffixes, identical endings for verb tenses and moods, past tense by applying thematic vowels *-ā- and *-ē-, as well as its own lexicon, including onomastic elements.

Proto-Baltic area 

Baltic hydronyms cover a vast area of 860,000 km2 from Vystula River in the west to Moscow in the east and from the Baltic Sea in the north all the way to Kyiv in the south. The current Lithuanian and Latvian lands combined constitute approximately one-sixth of the former Baltic territory. Some researchers suggest that in the past Baltic lands from Vystula to Daugava were inhabited by Baltic Finnic tribes but they were assimilated by the Baltic newcomers later on. There is still an ongoing debate regarding the boundary of hydronyms in the southwest: Lithuanian linguist Simas Karaliūnas believed that practically all of the basins of Oder and Vystula Rivers belonged to the Baltic hydronym habitat while German linguist Hermann Schall suggested that Baltic hydronyms could be found much further west all the way to Elbe, Saxony and Rügen island. During the 2nd and 1st millennium BC, the Baltic people inhabited larger territories than Germanic and Slavic people did at the time. It is estimated that the Proto-Baltic lands had up to 500,000 people.

Inhabitants of the Proto-Baltic area were surrounded by Germanic people in the west, Slavs in the south and Finno-Ugric people in the north and northeast. Russian philologist Vladimir Toporov believes that during 1000–800 BC Proto-Germanic people began expanding into the western Baltic territory starting from the Pasłęka River. Later on, the Baltic area began shrinking even more due to the migration of the Goths. During the migration period Slavic people began expanding into the northern and eastern territories of the Balts. From 11th to 12th century, Russian scriptures mention ongoing battles near Moscow with Eastern Galindians. Since 1225, the conquests of the Teutonic Order in the current Baltic region intensified and later on resulted in the extinction of the Old Prussians in the 18th century.

Relationship with other language groups

Slavic languages 

Linguists are considering the possibility of present-day Baltic and Slavic languages having a common point of linguistic development. Some supporters of the Baltic and Slavic languages unity even claim that Proto-Baltic branch did not exist, suggesting that Proto-Balto-Slavic split into three language groups: Eastern Baltic, Western Baltic and Proto-Slavic. However, critics point out that the phonology and morphology, which is shared by all known Baltic languages, is much more archaic than that of Proto-Slavic, retaining many features attributed to other attested Indo-European languages roughly 3000 years ago.

It is also known that some Baltic and Slavic languages have more in common that others: Old Prussian and Latvian share more commonalities with Slavic languages than Lithuanian. Some similarities between Baltic and Slavic can be found on all levels of linguistic analysis, which led German philologist August Schleicher to believe that there was indeed a common point of development. French linguist Antoine Meillet, however, rejected this idea and claimed that similarities between Baltic and Slavic languages were a result of close contact. Meanwhile, Latvian linguist Jānis Endzelīns suggested that following the split of PIE, Baltic and Slavic languages evolved independently, but later experienced a common period of greater contact. Jan Michał Rozwadowski proposed that the two language groups were indeed a unity after the division of Indo-European, but also suggested that after the two had divided into separate entities (Baltic and Slavic), they had posterior contact. Russian liguists Vladimir Toporov and Vyacheslav Ivanov believed that Proto-Slavic language formed from the peripheral-type Baltic dialects.

Germanic languages 
There is some vocabulary (about 60 words) that Baltic and Germanic languages share, excluding loanwords. Common vocabulary mostly includes words relating to work, equipment, agriculture etc., such as Proto-Baltic *darbas, meaning 'work' and Proto-Germanic *derbaz, meaning 'bold, determined, strong' < *derbaną 'to work', Proto-Baltic *derṷā and Proto-Germanic *terwą, meaning 'tar, resin', Proto-Baltic *gāmurii̯as and Proto-Germanic *gōmô, meaning 'palate'. Baltic and Germanic languages also share numeral formation for 11 to 19, both partially possess the same formation of verbs in past tense (ablaut), absence of the aorist. According to German linguist Wolfgang P. Schmid, at first Proto-Baltic was a centum language along with Proto-Germanic, but it eventually became satem later on. Some scholars believe that Baltic and Germanic contacts are older than those with Slavic languages while others claim the opposite. According to Lithuanian linguist Saulius Ambrazas, Germanic people borrowed certain suffixes from their Baltic neighbours, such as *-ing-, *-isko-, *-ō-men- (e. g., Old High German: arming 'poor person', Old Icelandic: bernska 'childhood', Gothic: aldōmin (dat.) 'senility').

Phonetics and phonology

Vowels and diphthongs 
The vowels of Proto-Baltic changed little in comparison to PIE: short vowels *a and *o coincided into a single *a while the reduced Indo-European primary vowel schwa (*ə) also turned into *a as it did in other Indo-European languages of Europe and it ceased to exist in the middle of words. According to the proponents of the Laryngeal theory, the primary schwa appeared by turning laryngeals into vowels, which makes its reconstruction for PIE unnecessary and obsolete. There were four short and five long vowels as well as four short and six long diphthongs as presented below: 

Vowels *a, *e, *i, *u together with semivowels *r, *l, *m, *n of Proto-Baltic were used to form mixed diphthongs as they are being used in the modern Baltic languages today. It is also well known that there were mixed diphthongs with long vowels at the endings. Long diphthongs can be reconstructed when glottaling (e. g., PIE: *pl̥h₁nós 'full' > Proto-Baltic: *pī́ˀlnas 'full'), compared to PIE, the position of stress in the example is conditioned by Hirt's law. Long mixed diphthongs, which position in the morpheme is hardly determined or their existence is questionable are presented in Italic:

Consonants 
The consonants of Proto-Baltic experienced greater changes than primary vowels when in their primordial condition. PIE aspirated and labialized velar consonants (*bʰ, *dʰ, *gʰ, *gu̯, *gu̯ʰ, *ku̯) in Proto-Baltic coincided with plain consonants (*b, *d, *g, *k) as they did in some other Indo-European languages. However, at the early stages of development, the differences between plain and aspirated voiced plosives might have been retained. This is because before the plain voiced plosives the vowels were lengthened, which is not the case with the aspirated voiced ones (Winter's law). The Proto-Baltic was a satem language, PIE *ḱ turned into *š, PIE *ǵ and PIE *ǵʰ turned into *ž.

The semivowels of PIE *ṛ, *ḷ, *ṃ, *ṇ, which were used as vowels or to form a syllable, turned into mixed diphthongs *ir, *il, *im, *in (in rarer cases—*ur, *ul, *um, *un) in Proto-Baltic. These diphthongs alternated with *er (*ēr), *el (*ēl), *em (*ēm), *en (*ēn) and *ar (*ōr), *al (*ōl), *am (*ōm), *an (*ōn).

One of the unique properties of Baltic languages is the disappearance of the semivowel *i̯ between a consonant and a front vowel (e. g., *žemi̯ē > *žemē 'earth').

Another noteworthy trait of Proto-Baltic is the retained intact *m existing before front dental consonants *t, *d, *s (e. g., *šimtan 'hundred', *kimdai 'gloves', *tamsā 'darkness'), which in other Indo-European languages turned into n. However, unlike in Italic or Indo-Iranian languages, in Proto-Baltic *m and *ṃ would become *n at the very end of a word.

Stress and pitch accent 
In the Proto-Baltic language, the stress could be placed on any syllable, the stress was free, unfixed. According to the movement of stress, three possible variants of accent system are reconstructed: 1) a system with baritone accentuation (stress on the stem) and oxytonic accentuation (stress on the endings), 2) a system with baritone accentuation and mobile accentuation (stress moves from endings to the stem), 3) a system with the baritone, mobile and oxytonic accentuations.

There were two pitch accents, an acute (´) and a circumflex (˜), which were pronounced with pure and mixed diphthongs and long vowels. Pitch accents could be pronounced both in the stems and in the endings. The acute pitch had a rising intonation, while the circumflex pitch had a falling intonation. Some scientists (Zigmas Zinkevičius, Vytautas Kardelis, etc.) believe that pitch accents were pronounced both in stressed and unstressed syllables, for example *'rãnkā́ 'hand' (stress placed on the first syllable, although both syllables had different pitch accents).

Morphology

Nouns 
The noun of Proto-Baltic possessed very archaic traits—the endings were not being shortened and were close to the endings of PIE. It had three grammatical categories: gender (masculine, feminine and neuter), number (singular, dual and plural) and seven cases: nominative, genitive, dative, accusative, instrumental, locative and vocative with three different dual case forms. In comparison to the PIE reconstruction, Proto-Baltic only failed to retain the ablative and allative cases. Neuter gender was only retained by Old Prussian while in Latvian and Lithuanian it ceased to exist. That said, other neuter forms of inflected words such as adjectives, participles, pronouns and numerals remained in Lithuanian.

*ā-stem and *ē-stem nouns were feminine, *o-stem nouns basically were masculine and neuter, *s-stem nouns were neuter while other noun stems could refer to all three genders. Unlike feminine and masculine nouns, neuter ones always had the same form for the nominative, accusative, and vocative cases. This form distinguished neuter nouns from masculine and feminine ones belonging to the same stem. Masculine and feminine nouns of the same stem had identical endings, and the grammatical gender was indicated by gender-changing words (pronouns, adjectives, participles, etc.) used with nouns: *labas anglis 'a good coal' (masculine), *labā au̯is 'a good sheep' (feminine), *laban mari 'a good sea' (neuter). Because of the disappearance of the semivowel *i̯ between a consonant and a front vowel, neuter *i-stem words had changes *mari̯ī > *marī 'two seas', *aru̯i̯ī > *aru̯ī 'two suitable ones' in dual.

*o-stem nouns 
*deiṷas 'God', *butan / *buta 'house'

*ā-stem nouns 
*rankā 'hand'

*ē-stem nouns 
*žemē 'earth'

*i-stem nouns 
*anglis 'coal, charcoal', *au̯is 'sheep', *mari 'sea'

*u-stem nouns 
*sūnus 'son', *girnus 'millstone', *medu 'honey'

*r-stem nouns 
*brātē 'brother', *duktē 'daughter'

*n-stem nouns 
*akmō 'stone', *sēmen 'seed'

*l-stem nouns 
*ābō(l) 'apple-tree'

*s-stem nouns 
*nebas 'cloud'

Root nouns 
*ṷaišpats 'lord', *šēr 'heart'
{| class="wikitable"
! rowspan="2" |Case
! colspan="2" |Singular
! colspan="2" |Dual
! colspan="2" |Plural
|-
!Masculine
!Neuter
!Masculine
!Neuter
!Masculine
!Neuter
|-
!Nominative
|*ṷaišpats
|*šēr
|*ṷaišpate
|*šerdī
|*ṷaišpates
|*šerdā
|-
!Genitive
|*ṷaišpates
|*širdes
|*ṷaišpataus
|*širdaus
|*ṷaišpatōn
|*širdōn
|-
!Dative
|*ṷaišpatei
|*širdei
|*ṷaišpatmā
|*širdmā
|*ṷaišpatmas
|*širdmas
|-
!Accusative
|*ṷaišpatin
|*šēr
|*ṷaišpate
|*šerdī
|*ṷaišpatins
|*šerdā
|-
!Instrumental
|*ṷaišpatmi
|*širdmi
|*ṷaišpatmā
|*širdmā 
|*ṷaišpatmīs
|*širdmīs'''
|-
!Locative
|*ṷaišpati|*širdi|*ṷaišpataus|*širdaus|*ṷaišpatsu|*širdsu|-
!Vocative
|*ṷaišpat!|*šēr!|*ṷaišpate!|*šerdī!|*ṷaišpates!|*šerdā!|}

 Adjectives 
Unlike the noun, the adjective used to be alternated using a gender (masculine, feminine, and neuter), which was then adapted to the corresponding gender of the noun. Adjectives had three degrees: positive (no suffix: masculine *labas, neuter *laban, feminine *labā 'good'), comparative (suffix *-es-: masculine *labesis, neuter *labesi, feminine *labesē 'better') and superlative (suffix *-im-: masculine *labimas, neuter *labiman, feminine *labimā 'the best'). They had singular, dual and plural numbers as they were applied to adjectives for combining them with nouns. The vocative case usually concurred with the nominative one.

As in the case of noun paradigms, there were *i̯o- (fem. *i̯ā-) and *ii̯o- (fem. *ē-) stem variants next to the *o-stem adjectives. Feminine gender forms were constructed with the *ā-stem while the feminine forms with the *i̯ā-stem (sing. nom. *-ī) were constructed with the *u-stem adjectives. The feminine gender of the masculine and neuter genders for the *i-stem probably resulted with *i̯ā- or *ē-stems. However, the reconstruction of the later is difficult as the *i-stem adjectives in the current Baltic languages were poorly preserved.

 *o-stem, *ā-stem adjectives *labas 'good'

 *u-stem, *i̯ā-stem adjectives *platus 'wide'

 *i-stem, *ē-stem adjectives *aru̯is 'suitable'

 Verbs 
The reconstruction of the verb of Proto-Baltic is mostly based on the collected data on the Eastern Baltic languages, as the verb system in Old Prussian is poorly attested. The reconstructed verb system is attributed to the later stages of linguistic development. Unlike other parts of speech, the verb of Proto-Baltic experienced a lot of changes—the grammatical mood, tense and voice systems that came from PIE changed. For instance, from the former Proto-Indo-European tenses—the present, the aorist, the perfect—only the present was preserved by Proto-Baltic in addition to the sigmatic future, which by some researchers is considered to be an inheritance from late PIE.

In PIE there were four moods: indicative, subjunctive, optative and imperative. In Proto-Baltic, indicative remained but subjunctive was changed by the newly formed conditional mood. Meanwhile, imperative gained forms from optative. PIE also had two verb voices – active and mediopassive. The latter was changed with reflexive verbs in Proto-Baltic. New types of verb form (the analytical perfect and the pluperfect) and the analytical passive voice were created. The most archaic trait of Proto-Baltic is the retained athematic conjugation.Bičovský, J. (2009). Vademecum starými indoevropskými jazyky [Pocket Reference in Old Indo-European Languages] (in Czech) Prague: Charles University Publishing House. p. 199. . In the first and second person forms, Proto-Baltic had preserved the three numbers from PIE (singular, dual and plural), while in third person, number was not distinguished.

The verb of the Proto-Baltic had three basic stems, i.e. the stems of the present tense, past tense and the infinitive. All forms of the verb were based on those stems. For example, the stems of the verb 'to carry' were *neša-, *nešē-, *neš-; the stems of the verb 'to sit' were *sēdi-, *sēdējā-, *sēdē-. Compared to Lith. nẽša 'he carrys', nẽšė 'he carried', nèšti 'to carry'; sė́di 'he sits', sėdė́jo 'he sat', sėdė́ti 'to sit'.

 Conjugation 
CH. Stang identifies the following conjugations of verbs in the present tense: athematic, thematic (*o-stem verbs) and semi-thematic (*i-stem and *ā-stem verbs). The future tense was formed using the *-s- / -*si- suffix attached to the infinitive stem, and because of the *-si- suffix, all future tense verbs were conjugated with the *i-stem. The past tense had *ā- and *ē-stems. With a few exceptions (1st sg. conditional *rinkti̯ā 'I would gather', 2nd sg. imperative *renkais 'gather!'), all verb endings were borrowed from the present tense.

 Infinitive 
In Proto-Baltic the infinitive was created with suffixes *-tei, *-tēi, *-ti: *eitei, *-tēi, *-ti 'go', *darītei, *-tēi, *-ti 'do'. The infinitive comes from the singular nominal of the word stem ti in its dative (*mirtei 'for death') and locative (*mirtēi 'in death'; consonant stem —*darānti 'in doing' (active participle, masculine–neuter) form. In Lithuanian, the relationship between the infinitive and dative can sometimes be observed to this day (e. g., kėdė yra sėdėti / sėdėjimui 'the chair is for sitting', ne metas liūdėti / liūdėjimui 'no time for sadness').

 Supine 
In Proto-Baltic the supine was created with suffixes *-tun < PIE *-tum: *eitun, *darītun. This verb form is unconjugated and was used together with the verbs of movement to express the circumstances of a goal or an intention. The supine comes from the singular nominal of the word stem tu in its accusative form (*leitun 'rain'). The connection can be observed in the existing dialects of the current Baltic languages and is considered to be inherited from PIE as the supine can be found in other Indo-European languages as well.

 Aspect 
Aspect (e. g., imperfective aspect  'I was gathering' vs. perfective aspect  'I had gathered') might have been unusual to Proto-Baltic, as aorist tense, which were used to express a perfective aspect of a process in contrast to the present tense used to express the imperfective aspect, fell out of use.

 Participle 
Proto-Baltic had active and passive voice participles. Traditionally, it is believed that active voice participles already existed in PIE. Participles were modified in case the same way as the nominals. The vocative case probably coincided with the nominative one. The participle had three genders (masculine, feminine and neuter), numbers (singular, dual, plural) and tenses (present, future, past). Active participles were used to express a specific trait of an object that arises as a result of their own doing while passive participles were meant to express a specific trait of an object that arises as a result of someone else taking action.

Present participles of the verbs *rinktei 'gather, collect', *turētei 'have', *laikītei 'hold':
{| class="wikitable" style="text-align: center;"
|+Present active participles
! colspan="2" rowspan="2" |
! colspan="3" |*o-stem
! colspan="3" |*i-stem
! colspan="3" |*ā-stem
|-
!Masculine
!Neuter
!Feminine
!Masculine
!Neuter
!Feminine
!Masculine
!Neuter
!Feminine
|-
! rowspan="6" |Singular
!NominativeVocative
|*renkants|*renkant|*renkantī|*turints|*turint|*turintī|*laikānts|*laikānt|*laikāntī|-
!Genitive
| colspan="2" |*renkantes|*renkanti̯ās| colspan="2" |*turintes|*turinti̯ās| colspan="2" |*laikāntes|*laikānti̯ās|-
!Dative
| colspan="2" |*renkantei|*renkanti̯āi| colspan="2" |*turintei|*turinti̯āi| colspan="2" |*laikāntei|*laikānti̯āi|-
!Accusative
|*renkantin|*renkant|*renkanti̯ān|*turintin|*turint|*turinti̯ān|*laikāntin|*laikānt|*laikānti̯ān|-
!Instrumental
| colspan="2" |*renkantmi|*renkanti̯ān| colspan="2" |*turintmi|*turinti̯ān| colspan="2" |*laikāntmi|*laikānti̯ān|-
!Locative
| colspan="2" |*renkanti|*renkanti̯āi| colspan="2" |*turinti|*turinti̯āi| colspan="2" |*laikānti|*laikānti̯āi|-
! rowspan="3" |Dual
!NominativeAccusativeVocative
|*renkante|*renkantī|*renkanti̯āi|*turinte|*turintī|*turinti̯āi|*laikānte'|*laikāntī|*laikānti̯āi|-
!DativeInstrumental
| colspan="2" |*renkantmā|*renkanti̯āmā| colspan="2" |*turintmā|*turinti̯āmā| colspan="2" |*laikāntmā|*laikānti̯āmā|-
!GenitiveLocative
| colspan="2" |*renkantaus|*renkanti̯āus| colspan="2" |*turintaus|*turinti̯āus| colspan="2" |*laikāntaus|*laikānti̯āus|-
! rowspan="6" |Plural
!NominativeVocative
|*renkantes|*renkantā|*renkanti̯ās|*turintes|*turintā|*turinti̯ās|*laikāntes|*laikāntā|*laikānti̯ās|-
!Genitive
| colspan="2" |*renkantōn|*renkanti̯ōn| colspan="2" |*turintōn|*turinti̯ōn| colspan="2" |*laikāntōn|*laikānti̯ōn|-
!Dative
| colspan="2" |*renkantmas|*renkanti̯āmas| colspan="2" |*turintmas|*turinti̯āmas| colspan="2" |*laikāntmas|*laikānti̯āmas|-
!Accusative
|*renkantins|*renkantā|*renkanti̯āns|*turintins|*turintā|*turinti̯āns|*laikāntins|*laikāntā|*laikānti̯āns|-
!Instrumental
| colspan="2" |*renkantmīs|*renkanti̯āmīs| colspan="2" |*turintmīs|*turinti̯āmīs| colspan="2" |*laikāntmīs|*laikānti̯āmīs|-
!Locative
| colspan="2" |*renkantsu|*renkanti̯āsu| colspan="2" |*turintsu|*turinti̯āsu| colspan="2" |*laikāntsu|*laikānti̯āsu|}

Future participles of the verbs *eitei 'go', *turētei 'have':

Past participles of the verbs *eitei 'go', *turētei 'have', *laikītei 'hold':

 Pronouns 
The inflexions of PIE were already different significantly in comparison to nominals. As in the case of PIE, the demonstrative pronouns of Proto-Baltic could indicate three levels of varying distance from the speaker: close range *šis and *is, distant range *anas, and unspecified range *tas. The latter demonstrative pronoun, which had three grammatical genders, was the equivalent to the third-person. There were two personal pronouns, they had no grammatical gender — *ež (*eš) 'I' and *tu / *tū 'you', which possessed suppletive inflexion forms preserved from PIE. The reflexive pronoun *seu̯e 'oneself' only had a singular form without the nominative as it does in the current Baltic languages. The singular forms of the pronoun *seu̯e were also used with dual and plural objects, i.e. the singular also served as dual and plural.

Dutch Professor Frederik Kortlandt believed that only the oldest and non-renewed pronoun forms should be reconstructed in Proto-Baltic language while Lithuanian linguist-historian Professor Zigmas Zinkevičius believed older pronoun forms only existed at the earliest stages of Proto-Baltic.

 Personal pronouns 
First person

Second person

Third person
Demonstrative pronoun *tas was the equivalent to the third person.

 Reflexive pronoun 

 Interrogrative pronouns 
There were two interrogative pronouns—masculine *kat[a/e]ras, neuter *kat[a/e]ra, feminine *kat[a/e]rā, all meaning 'which', and masculine–feminine *kas, neuter *ka, meaning 'who, what'. The latter was used as a relative pronoun in compound sentences. According to Zigmas Zinkevičius, relative pronouns had all three genders, and Vytautas Mažiulis believed pronoun *kas had the feminine form *kā when it was used as a relative pronoun. Interrogative and relative pronouns were inflected the same way as the demonstrative pronoun *tas. Indefinite pronouns 
Indefinite pronouns, such as masculine *kitas, neuter *kita, feminine *kitā , meaning 'other', or masculine *u̯isas, neuter *u̯isa, feminine *u̯isā, meaning 'all, entire, whole', were also inflected as the pronoun *tas.

 Possessive pronouns 
Possessive pronouns indicate divisions between Baltic dialects: the western areal would have forms, such as the masculine *mai̯as, neuter *mai̯a, feminine *mai̯ā 'mine'; masculine *tu̯ai̯as, neuter *tu̯ai̯a, feminine *tu̯ai̯ā 'yours'; masculine *su̯ai̯as, neuter *su̯ai̯a,  feminine *su̯ai̯ā 'oneself'. In comparison, the eastern areal would possess forms like the masculine *menas, neuter *mena, feminine *menā; masculine *teu̯as, neuter *teu̯a, feminine *teu̯ā; masculine *seu̯as, neuter *seu̯a, feminine *seu̯ā, respectively. These pronouns would be inflected as other gendered pronouns, although they could have been used only in their genitive form. The eigenvalue of plural and dual possessive pronouns was possibly expressed in the genitive case of plural personal pronouns (e. g., *nōsōn (→*nūsōn) 'ours', *ṷōsōn (→*i̯ūsōn) 'yours').

Western Baltic pronouns masculine *su̯ai̯as, neuter *su̯ai̯a,  feminine *su̯ai̯ā 'oneself', Eastern Baltic ones masculine *seu̯as, neuter *seu̯a, feminine *seu̯ā 'oneself' could be used with all persons. The equivalent of third person possessive pronoun was the genitive case of the
demonstrative pronoun *tas, which had three numbers and genders.

 Numerals 
Numerals, except for 'two', had noun endings: *ainas (PIE: *oinos) 'one' was inflected the same way as noun word stems o (masculine and neuter) and ā (feminine), this numeral had a singular, dual and plural number; masculine *d(u)u̯ō (PIE: *duu̯ō) and neuter-feminine *d(u)u̯ai (PIE: *duu̯oi) 'two' was inflected as a demonstrative pronoun dual; *trii̯es (masc. PIE: *trei̯es) 'three' was inflected as a plural noun with the word stem i and was common for all genders; meanwhile *ketures (masc. PIE: *ku̯etu̯ores) 'four' was inflected as a plural noun with the consonant word stem r and was also the same for all three genders.

Proto-Baltic people applied the principles for *ketures (PIE: *ku̯etu̯ores) 'four' inflexion to numerals *penkes (PIE: *penku̯e) 'five', *ušes / *sešes (PIE:*u̯eḱs / *su̯eḱs) 'six', *septines (PIE:*septṃ) 'seven', *aštōnes (PIE: *oḱtō) 'eight' and *neu̯ines (PIE: *neu̯ṇ) 'nine'. In PIE, numerals from five to nine were not inflected. The early Proto-Baltic might have retained the uninflected numeral forms of *septin 'seven', *aštō 'eight', *neu̯in 'nine' as well. The reconstruction of Latvian language indicates that *septines 'seven' and *neu̯ines 'nine' with the short *i is plausible.

 Ordinal numbers 
The masculine and neuter ordinal numbers were inflected as nouns possessing word stem o while feminine ones were inflected as nouns with word stem ā. Ordinal numbers from first to tenth in Proto-Baltic were as follows:

 References 

 Further reading 
 Hill, Eugen. "Phonological evidence for a Proto-Baltic stage in the evolution of East and West Baltic". In: International journal of diachronic linguistics and linguistic reconstruction [IJDL]. 2016, 13, p. 205-232. .
 Kortland, Frederic. "Proto-Baltic?". In: Baltistica. 2018, t. 53, Nr. 2, pp. 175–185. DOI: 	10.15388/Baltistica.53.2.2338
 Svensson, Miguel Villanueva. "On the relationship between West Baltic and East Baltic". In: Baltai ir slavai: dvasinių kultūrų sankirtos. Vilnius: Versmė, 2014. pp. 162–176. .

 External links 
 Lithuanian Etymological Dictionary Database (in Lithuanian) Old Prussian Language Heritage Database (in Lithuanian) Foundations of Baltic Languages, Pietro U. Dini (in English)''

Indo-European languages
Proto-languages
Baltic languages